The GBU-12 Paveway II is an American aerial laser-guided bomb, based on the Mk 82 500-pound (227 kg) general-purpose bomb, but with the addition of a nose-mounted laser seeker and fins for guidance. A member of the Paveway series of weapons, Paveway II entered into service c. 1976. It is currently in service with the U.S. Air Force, U.S. Navy, U.S. Marine Corps, and various other air forces.

Development and deployment 

The development of the GBU-12 traces back to the Vietnam War. The U.S. Air Force wanted a greater variety of laser-guided bombs, especially a lighter and more maneuverable one to be able to hit moving targets on the Ho Chi Minh trail. Earlier designs of guided bombs such as the BOLT-117 were quickly superseded by the Paveway series of add-on kits for conventional bombs.

GBU-12 bombs (along with the balance of the Paveway series) are produced by defense contractors Lockheed Martin and Raytheon. Raytheon began production after purchasing the product line from Texas Instruments. Lockheed Martin was awarded a contract to compete with Raytheon when there was a break in production caused by transferring manufacturing out of Texas. "Paveway II" refers specifically to the guidance kit, rather than to the weapon itself. See also GBU-16 Paveway II, where the same guidance unit is fitted to a Mk 83 1,000-lb bomb (454 kg).

The GBU-12 has been used in numerous conflicts such as the Gulf War where the U.S. Air Force reports an 88% hit rate. It is among the most commonly used guided munitions, and as such is able to be dropped from a very wide variety of aircraft, such as the B-52, A-10, F-15E, and F/A-18.

Guidance 

The US Department of Defense has upgraded GBU-12 production versions to include GPS guidance modes. Lockheed Martin is the sole source for US Navy purchases of this version. Raytheon sells upgraded GBU-12s to the US Government and 23 other nations.
Laser-guided bombs are often labeled "smart bombs" because they are able to follow a non-ballistic trajectory when laser designation of the intended target is undertaken.

Paveway II laser-guided bombs use what is known as "bang bang" guidance. This means the bomb's fins deflect fully, rather than proportionally when it is attempting to guide to the laser spot. For example, if it sees the laser spot and determines that it should make a change it deflects its fins until it has over-corrected and then it deflects back the opposite direction, creating a sinusoidal type of flight path. This type of guidance may be less efficient at times, however is more cost-effective and allows the use of simpler electronics in the guidance system.

References

External links

Raytheon's official Paveway fact page
Globalsecurity.org Paveway fact page
Lockheed Martin Paveway fact page

Guided bombs of the United States
Texas Instruments
Military equipment introduced in the 1970s